The Puerto Rico men's national softball team is the men's national softball team of Puerto Rico.  The team competed at the 1996 ISF Men's World Championship in Midland, Michigan where they finished with 5 wins and 5 losses.  The team competed at the 2009 ISF Men's World Championship in Saskatoon, Saskatchewan where they finished twelfth.

References

Softball
Men's national softball teams
Men's sports in Puerto Rico
Softball in Puerto Rico